Joe Zoherliana (born 10 May 1999), is an Indian professional footballer who plays as a defender for NorthEast United in the Indian Super League.

Club career 
He was born to Zohmangaiha. Joe started to play locally in Mizoram before moving to the Shillong Lajong F.C. Academy in Meghalaya, where he also made his senior debut in the Shillong Premier League. Thereafter he returned to his home state to play for Mizoram Premier League side Chanmari F.C. of Aizawl before joining Indian Super League outfit FC Pune City.

He was signed by Aizawl F.C. in 2018. He made his professional debut for the Aizawl against East Bengal F.C. on 14 November 2018, He started and played full match match as Aizawl won 3–2.

NorthEast United
On 9 September 2021, NorthEast United announced that they had completed the signing of Joe on a three-year deal. He made his debut against Goa on 4 December, which ended in a 2–1 win as a substitute for Provat Lakra in the 17th minute of the game. He won the Hero of the match at two matches for the club in the 2021-22 season. He ended the season as one of the best NorthEast player in that season, in which the club only managed 14 points from 20 matches. At the last match of NorthEast United in 2021-22 season, his father was the 12th man to support the club.

Career statistics

Club

References

1999 births
Living people
People from Mamit
Indian footballers
Aizawl FC players  
Bengaluru FC players
Footballers from Mizoram
I-League players
Association football defenders
Indian Super League players
FC Pune City players
Chanmari FC players
NorthEast United FC players